Newstead is a locality located in the Inverell Shire of New South Wales.

References 

Towns in New South Wales
Towns in New England (New South Wales)